This is a list of films which placed number one at the weekend box office in Mexico for the year 2012.

Highest-grossing films

References

See also
 List of Mexican films — Mexican films by year

2012
Box
Mexico